Donald R. Philbrick (August 14, 1937 – January 18, 2022) was an American politician.

Philbrick was born in Conway, New Hampshire, and graduated from Kennett High School. He went to DeVry University in Chicago. Philbrick then served in the United States Air Force from 1954 to 1976. Philbrick then lived with his wife in Eaton, New Hampshire. He served in the New Hampshire House of Representatives and was a Republican.

References

1937 births
2022 deaths
People from Conway, New Hampshire
Military personnel from New Hampshire
DeVry University alumni
Republican Party members of the New Hampshire House of Representatives